A Singsong and a Scrap is the 12th studio album by Chumbawamba released in 2005. It shows more folk influence than their previous album Un and features guest appearances from folk musicians such as Coope Boyes and Simpson, Andy Cutting and John Jones and Ian Telfer of Oysterband. The first single to be taken from the album is "Fade Away".

Background

"Laughter in a Time of War", "By and By", and "Walking into Battle with the Lord" feature vocals by John Jones. Additionally, Coope Boyes and Simpson contribute vocals to "Walking into Battle with the Lord", "Bankrobber", and "The Land of Do What You're Told". "By and By" is a tribute to Swedish-American labour activist Joe Hill. "You Can (Mass Tresspass)" takes inspiration from the Mass Trespass of Kinder Scout, which led to land access reform across the UK. "When Alexander Met Emma" is about anarchists Emma Goldman and Alexander Berkman. "Bankrobber" is a cover of the Clash song of the same name, featured here in an a capella arrangement.

Chumbawamba recorded a cover of the traditional Italian song "Bella Ciao" in the wake of the controversial death of activist Carlo Giuliani in Genoa. The album features a hidden track, "The Untraditional", which is a song about forbidden love in the English folk tradition. Any mention of the track on the package was omitted to reinforce the "taboo" subject nature and "because it tries to make its point in a very quiet way".

Track listing
All songs written, arranged and produced by Chumbawamba, except "Bankrobber" written by Joe Strummer and Mick Jones and "Bella Ciao" (traditional).

 "Laughter in a Time of War" – 2:46
 "William Francis" – 3:39
 "By and By" – 4:31
 "You Can (Mass Trespass, 1932)" – 4:38
 "Walking into Battle with the Lord" – 2:56
 "When Alexander Met Emma" – 3:10
 "Fade Away (I Don't Want To)" – 3:10
 "Bankrobber" – 2:07
 "Learning to Love" – 3:12
 "The Land of Do What You're Told" – 4:19
 "Bella Ciao" – 1:34
 "Smith and Taylor" – 4:00
 "The Untraditional" – 1:56

Personnel

All instruments and voices
Jude Abbott 
Lou Watts 
Boff Whalley
Neil Ferguson

With

 John Jones & Barry Coope, Jim Boyes & Lester Simpson – Vocals
 Winkie Thin – Accordion on 1, 4, 7, 10, 12; Whistling on 6; Cello on 9
 Richard Ormrod – Accordion on 3; Mellophone on 12
 Andy Cutting – Melodeon on 2,9
 James O'Grady – Uillean pipes on 3, 13; Whistle on 2
 Ian Telfer – Fiddle on 7, 10

References
 Chumbawamba news

External links

A Singsong and a Scrap at YouTube (streamed copy where licensed)

Chumbawamba albums
2005 albums
No Masters albums